Sulman may refer to:

George William Sulman (born 1866), Ontario merchant and political figure
Florence Sulman (1876–1965), English-Australian author and educationalist
John Sulman (1849–1934), Australian architect
Khalifah ibn Sulman Al Khalifah (born 1936), the Prime Minister of Bahrain

See also
Darkha Sulman Khel, town and union council in the Khyber-Pakhtunkhwa province of Pakistan
Sir John Sulman Medal, New South Wales architectural prize
Sir John Sulman Prize, one of Australia's longest running art prizes